Chongfa Temple is a former Buddhist temple located within the Renmin Park, in Tianning District of Changzhou, Jiangsu, China.

History
The temple traces its origins to a vegetable garden, founded by Chen Gaoren in the Sui dynasty (581–619) and would later become a Buddhist temple. In the Baoda period (943–957) of the Southern Tang dynasty (937–976), it was known as "Dasheng Temple". It was renamed "Sengqie Temple" at the dawn of Northern Song dynasty. In 1125, Huizong Emperor honored the name "Chongfa Chan Temple". In the reign of Hongwu Emperor (1368–1398) of the Ming dynasty (1368–1644), its name was changed to "Chongfa Buddhist Temple". Because the southeast corner of the temple had a bell tower, it was also more commonly known as "Bell Tower Temple". The temple was devastated by the Taiping Rebellion during the ruling of Xianfeng Emperor (1850–1861) in late Qing dynasty (1644–1911), and was restored and rebuilt in Guangxu period (1875–1908).

After the establishment of the Communist State, the wing-room was demolished, only the Mahavira Hall survived. In December 1987, it was designated as a "Municipality Protected Historic Site" by Changzhou government.

Architecture
The Mahavira Hall is three rooms wide with single-eave gable and hip roof. A stone inscription named "On the Reconstruction of Bell Tower in Chongfa Temple" which was made in 1827 are embedded in the west wall. Now it is used as a teahouse.

References

Buddhist temples in Jiangsu
Buildings and structures in Changzhou
Tourist attractions in Changzhou
19th-century establishments in China
19th-century Buddhist temples